Chandupatla is a village in Yadadri district of the Indian state of Telangana. It is administered under Bhongir mandal of Bhongir revenue division.

References

Villages in Nalgonda district